James Burke (February 20, 1936 – May 11, 2006) was an American wrestler. He was a bronze medalist at the 1962 Greco-Roman World Championships and competed in the men's Greco-Roman lightweight division at the 1964 Summer Olympics.

References

1936 births
2006 deaths
American male sport wrestlers
Olympic wrestlers of the United States
Wrestlers at the 1964 Summer Olympics
Sportspeople from Denver
Pan American Games medalists in wrestling
Pan American Games gold medalists for the United States
Wrestlers at the 1959 Pan American Games
World Wrestling Championships medalists
20th-century American people